John George Koeltl (born October 25, 1945) is a United States district judge of the United States District Court for the Southern District of New York in Manhattan.

Education
Koeltl was born in New York City. He graduated from Regis High School in New York City in 1963. He studied history at Georgetown University, receiving an Artium Baccalaureus degree in 1967. In 1971 he obtained his Juris Doctor from Harvard Law School, where he was an editor of the Harvard Law Review. He served as a law clerk for Judge Edward Weinfeld of the Southern District of New York and then for Justice Potter Stewart of the United States Supreme Court.

Legal career
From 1973 to 1974, Koeltl served as an assistant special prosecutor for the Watergate Special Prosecution Force, then entered private law practice in New York. For several years, Koeltl was a partner at the New York law firm of Debevoise & Plimpton. During these years, Koeltl served on several committees of the Association of the Bar of the City of New York and American Bar Association and was the author of several published articles on securities law and other topics.

Federal judicial service
Koeltl was nominated by President Bill Clinton on April 26, 1994, to a seat vacated by Judge Shirley Wohl Kram. He was confirmed by the Senate on August 9, 1994, and commissioned on August 10, 1994.

Judge Koeltl is the assigned judge for the trial case of Arthur Hayes, Ben Delo, and Samuel Reed, co-founders of BitMEX. The trial date is set for March 28, 2022, in New York.

Notable decisions
Koeltl is known for his October 2006 decision to sentence civil rights lawyer Lynne Stewart to 28 months in prison for providing material assistance to a terrorist, her client, 1993 World Trade Center bombing mastermind Omar Abdel-Rahman, by secretly passing messages to his radical followers in Egypt. Koeltl rejected the prosecutors' recommendation of 30 years. The Second Circuit Court of Appeals ordered Koeltl to reconsider whether that sentence was too light and to take into account the government's arguments that she had committed perjury at her trial and abused her position as a lawyer. On remand, Koeltl cited remarks Stewart had made after being sentenced that indicated a lack of remorse. He changed the sentence to 10 years in prison.

In 2011, he presided over the case involving Raffaello Follieri, who pleaded guilty to conspiracy, fraud and money laundering in connection with purchases of property from the Catholic Church.  The Follieri case received significant media scrutiny due to his relationship with celebrities, notably Anne Hathaway and several politicians, including former president Bill Clinton and 2008 Republican presidential nominee John McCain. Koeltl also presided over a case brought by Citigroup against Wells Fargo to halt the latter's purchase of Wachovia, which Citi had earlier announced plans to purchase. The litigation settled in 2010.

A U.S. appeals court, in an opinion written by Koeltl, tossed out a $654 million jury verdict against the Palestine Liberation Organization for terrorist attacks in the early 2000s in Israel that killed or wounded Americans, saying the U.S. courts lack jurisdiction because the attacks were random and not aimed at the United States.

In April 2018 Koeltl was assigned to preside over a civil lawsuit filed by the Democratic National Committee against the Russian Federation, WikiLeaks, the Donald Trump presidential campaign, and several individuals. The suit alleges that Russian interference in the 2016 United States elections harmed Democrats. Koeltl, in dismissing the suit in July 2019, described WikiLeaks' publishing activities as "plainly of the type entitled to the strongest protection that the First Amendment offers."

In September 2020 Koeltl presided over Sam Party v. Kosinski in which the Serve America Party sued Todd D. Valentine and Robert A. Brehm, the Co-Execute Directors of the New York State Board of Elections, and Peter S. Kosinski, Douglas A. Kellner, and Andrew J. Spano, the Commissioners of the New York State Board of Elections (NYSBOE). The Serve America Movement (SAM) was added to Qualified New York political parties after it attained the required number of votes in the 2018 election for Governor of New York. NYSBOE changed New York State Election Law after the election, to increase the minimum requirement from 50,000 votes to 2% or about 130,000 votes. SAM alleged that the rule change violated the First Amendment rights to freedom of speech and association, and the equal protection and due process protections of the Fourteenth Amendment of the SAM Party and its supporters.

In May 2021 Koeltl presided over Libertarian Party of N.Y. v. N.Y. Bd. of Elections in which the Libertarian Party of New York and the Green Party of New York sued the New York State Board of Elections, its chairs, commissioners, and executive directors. The Libertarian Party and Green Party were added to Qualified New York political parties after they attained the required number of votes in the 2018 election for Governor of New York. After the NYSBOE rule change, the plaintiffs alleged that the amendments to the New York Election Law found in Sections 9 and 10 of Part ZZZ of the 2020-2021 Fiscal Year New York State Budget Bill ("Part ZZZ"), violated the First and Fourteenth Amendment rights of both parties. District Judge John G. Koeltl denied the request.

As a result of Koeltl's decision on both the Serve America Movement lawsuit and the Libertarian Party lawsuit, the Libertarian Party, Serve America Movement, Green Party, and Independence Party of New York have had their ballot access removal upheld in the State of New York.

See also 
 List of law clerks of the Supreme Court of the United States (Seat 8)

References

Sources

Individual Practices of Judge Koeltl from the US District Court for the Southern District of New York.

1945 births
Living people
Lawyers from New York City
Georgetown University alumni
Harvard Law School alumni
Law clerks of the Supreme Court of the United States
Judges of the United States District Court for the Southern District of New York
United States district court judges appointed by Bill Clinton
Regis High School (New York City) alumni
20th-century American judges
Philodemic Society members
21st-century American judges